The Spare Room is a 2008 novel by Australian writer Helen Garner, set over the course of three weeks while the narrator, Helen, cares for a friend dying of bowel cancer.

Plot summary

The novel is told from the first person perspective of a woman, Helen, who lives in Melbourne near her family. A friend Nicola, who is ill with bowel cancer, comes to stay with Helen in order to pursue alternative therapy for her disease. The cancer is considered terminal by her doctors. Helen is suspicious of the treatment and becomes more so as she sees its deleterious health effects. As the three weeks of the novel progress Helen becomes increasingly angry with Nicola for denying the seriousness of her illness, forcing those around her to do emotional work on her behalf in confronting her death, and in making light of them for doing so. At the end of the novel, Nicola returns to mainstream oncology treatment, and the doctors find that some of her symptoms are due to cancer having destroyed part of her vertebrae. The novel flashes forward to the months ahead, where Nicola returns to Sydney and eventually dies. A number of friends and family, including Helen, take turns as her caretaker. Nicola only truly embraces her death when a Buddhist friend tells her that in dying, she has something to teach them.

The novel draws heavily on both events and details from Garner's life. The narrator Helen lives next door to her daughter Eva and Eva's children, as Garner does with her daughter Alice Garner and her children, and plays the ukulele as Garner does. The events in the novel are based on Garner's spending a period caring for her friend Jenya Osborne when Osborne was dying. Garner chose to use her own first name for the narrator character as she wanted to admit to the least attractive or acceptable emotions that she felt as her friend died.

Critical response 

The publication of The Spare Room received considerable media coverage and the novel was favourably reviewed in several major Australian metropolitan newspapers. Points of interest included: Garner's simple and powerful prose style; Garner's return to fiction after the sixteen years since her last novel; and praise for her treatment of illness, mortality and the unattractive emotions it involves. Some reviewers found the strong similarities with Garner's life distracting. One noted some of the advantages of fiction, in that Garner was able to resolve the story in the novel in a way she could not in her major non-fiction works The First Stone and Joe Cinque's Consolation. Robert Dessaix wrote an extended review that although favourable argued that The Spare Room is not a novel, but closer to a piece of journalism or a report from a metaphorical battle front, particularly as the novel is highly focused on Helen's point of view and never on Nicola's interior experience. James Wood listed it in his New Yorker column for the Best Books of 2009.

Awards 

Victorian Premier's Literary Award, Vance Palmer Prize for Fiction, 2008: winner
Queensland Premier's Literary Awards, Best Fiction Book, 2008: winner
Barbara Jefferis Award, 2009: winner

References 

2008 Australian novels
Novels by Helen Garner
Novels set in Melbourne